"Erase My Scars" is a song by Canadian rock band Evans Blue. It was released in July 2010, as the third single from Evans Blue's self titled album. The song is dedicated to lead singer Dan Chandler's nephew, who died from brain cancer at the age of eight. A music video was shot and directed by Adrian Picardi and produced by Eric Ro of Northern Five Entertainment. "Erase My Scars" peaked at number forty-five on the Billboard Rock Songs chart. An acoustic version was exclusively released on KUPD's Acoustic 2010 compilation album.

Track listing

References

External links
Official Evans Blue Myspace

2010 singles
2009 songs
Evans Blue songs